Arthur Bergen (24 October 1875 – 1943) was an Austrian actor and film director. He was murdered at Auschwitz concentration camp during the Holocaust.

Selected filmography
Actor
 The Homecoming of Odysseus (1918)
 The Victors (1918)
 World by the Throat (1920)
 Humanity Unleashed (1920)
 The Oath of Stephan Huller (1921)
 The New Paradise (1921)
 The Golden Plague (1921)
 The False Dimitri (1922)
 Lola Montez, the King's Dancer (1922)
 The Passenger in the Straitjacket (1922)
 The Green Manuela (1923)
 Tragedy in the House of Habsburg (1924)
 Slums of Berlin (1925)
 Fire in the Opera House (1930)
 Panik in Chicago (1931)
 Different Morals (1931)
 Modern Dowry (1932)
 The Mad Bomberg (1932)
 Under False Flag (1932)
 Typhoon (1933)
 Greetings and Kisses, Veronika (1933)
 Today Is the Day (1933)
 The Emperor's Waltz (1933)

Screenwriter
 Lehmann's Honeymoon (1916)

Director
 I Lost My Heart in Heidelberg (1926)
 Poor Little Sif (1927)
 Only a Viennese Woman Kisses Like That (1928)

Bibliography
 Jung, Uli & Schatzberg, Walter. Beyond Caligari: The Films of Robert Wiene. Berghahn Books, 1999.

References

External links

1875 births
1943 deaths
Jewish Austrian male actors
Austrian male film actors
Austrian male silent film actors
Male actors from Vienna
Austrian people who died in Auschwitz concentration camp
20th-century Austrian male actors
Austrian Jews who died in the Holocaust